Francesco Piemontesi is a Swiss pianist.

Life 
Born in 1983 in Locarno, he studied at the Hochschule für Musik und Theater Hannover with Arie Vardi before closely collaborating with Alfred Brendel. He rose to international prominence with prizes at several major competitions, including the 2007 Queen Elisabeth Competition in Brussels. In 2009 he was awarded the fellowship of the Borletti-Buitoni Trust. From 2009 to 2011 he was chosen as a BBC New Generation Artist. In 2012, Piemontesi was announced as Artistic Director of the Settimane Musicali music festival in Ascona, and received the BBC Music Magazine Newcomer Award for his Recital disc with works by Haendel, Brahms, Bach and Liszt. Since 2012 he records exclusively for the French label Naïve Classique. He currently lives in Berlin.

Francesco Piemontesi has given concerts with major ensembles worldwide: Cleveland Orchestra, London Philharmonic Orchestra, Bavarian Radio Symphony Orchestra,
City of Birmingham Symphony Orchestra, NHK Symphony Orchestra, Gewandhausorchester Leipzig, Orchestre Philharmonique de Radio France, RSB and DSO Berlin. He has performed with such conductors as Zubin Mehta, Roger Norrington, Charles Dutoit, Jiří Bělohlávek, Stanisław Skrowaczewski, Vladimir Ashkenazy, Ton Koopman and Marek Janowski, and has appeared in many international music festivals including the BBC Proms, Edinburgh International Festival, Aix-en-Provence Festival and Mostly Mozart Festival.

Discography 
 Schoenberg, Messiaen & Ravel, PENTATONE, 2022
 Schubert: Last Piano Sonatas, PENTATONE, 2019
Debussy: Preludes, Naïve Records, 2015
 Mozart: Piano works, Naïve Records, 2014
 Schumann | Dvorak: Piano concertos (BBC Symphony Orchestra, Jiří Bělohlávek), Naïve Records 2013
 Frank Martin: Intégrale des Oeuvres pour Flûte (Emmanuel Pahud, Orchestre de la Suisse Romande, Thierry Fischer), Musiques Suisses 2012
 Recital: Händel, Brahms, Bach, Liszt, Avanti classics 2010
 Schumann: Piano works, Claves records 2009

External links 
 official website
 Naïve Classique
 Colbert Artists Management, Inc. - North American Management
 Sergei Rachmaninov, Piano sonata No. 2 Op. 36
 Francesco Piemontesi in concert with Frankfurt Radio Orchestra
 'The Spectator' magazine: portrait

References

1983 births
Living people
Swiss classical pianists
Prize-winners of the Queen Elisabeth Competition
Hochschule für Musik, Theater und Medien Hannover alumni
21st-century classical pianists
People from Locarno